McCrory School District 12 is a school district in Woodruff County, Arkansas. Their school mascot is the jaguar, specifically Jasper the jaguar.  The school's colors are orange and black.

References

External links
 

School districts in Arkansas